Wales competed at the 2018 Commonwealth Games in Gold Coast, Australia, from April 4 to April 15, 2018. It is Wales's 21st appearance at the Commonwealth Games, having competed at every Games since their inception in 1930.

Swimmer Jazz Carlin was the country's flag bearer during the opening ceremony.

Competitors
The following is the list of number of competitors participating at the Games per sport/discipline.

Medallists

| style="text-align:left; vertical-align:top;"|

Athletics

Team Wales announced its provisional squad of athletes on 27 November 2017 and 24 January 2018. The current 27-strong squad of 14 men and 13 women is correct as of 12 March 2018. However, only 12 women competed.

Men
Track & road events

Field events

Combined events – Decathlon

Women
Track & road events

Field events

Boxing

Team Wales announced its squad of 7 boxers (4 men and 3 women) on 24 January 2018.

Men

Women

Cycling

Team Wales announced the selection of para-cyclist James Ball on 29 November 2017.

Most of the 21-strong squad of 15 men and 6 women was made public on 24 January 2018, with Pete Mitchell confirmed as a para-cycling pilot on 1 February 2018.

Road
Men

Women

Track
Sprint

Keirin

Time trial

Pursuit

Points race

Scratch race

Mountain bike

Diving

On 24 January 2018, it was announced that Aidan Heslop will be the first diver in 20 years to represent Wales at the Commonwealth Games.

Men

Gymnastics

Team Wales announced its squad of 13 gymnasts (5 men and 8 women) on 23 February 2018.

Artistic

Men
Team Final & Individual Qualification

Individual Finals

Women
Team Final & Individual Qualification

Individual Finals

Rhythmic

Team Final & Individual Qualification

Individual Finals

Hockey

Wales qualified both men's and women's teams by placing in the top nine (excluding the host nation, Australia) among Commonwealth nations in the FIH World Rankings as of 31 October 2017. Each team consists of 18 players for a total of 36.

Both teams were announced on 1 March 2018.

Men's tournament

Roster

Lewis Prosser
Luke Hawker
David Kettle
James Fortnam
Jacob Draper
Dale Hutchinson
Rhys Gowman
Daniel Kyriakides
James Kyriakides
Alf Dinnie
Ben Francis
Gareth Furlong
Hywel Jones
Rupert Shipperley
Jonny Gooch
Steve Kelly
Owain Dolan Gray
James Carson

Pool B

9th–10th place match

Women's tournament

Roster

Leah Wilkinson
Sian French
Rose Thomas
Ella Jackson
Julie Whiting
Natasha Marke-Jones
Sophie Clayton
Sarah Jones
Lisa Daley
Phoebe Richards
Tina Evans
Dannielle Jordan
Eloise Laity
Beth Bingham
Izzie Howell
Delyth Thomas
Xenna Hughes
Jo Westwood

Pool B

9th–10th place match

Lawn bowls

Team Wales announced its squad of 17 lawn bowlers and directors (10 men and 7 women) in two tranches.

The first tranche of 7 participants was announced on 29 November 2017; the second tranche of 10 participants was announced on 24 January 2018.

Men

Women

Para-sport

Netball

Wales qualified a netball team by virtue of being ranked in the top 11 (excluding the host nation, Australia) of the INF World Rankings on July 1, 2017.

Pool B

Eleventh place match

Rugby sevens

Wales qualified a team of 12 men by being among the top nine ranked nations from the Commonwealth in the 2016–17 World Rugby Sevens Series ranking. In addition, they qualified a team of 12 women by being the top ranked Commonwealth nation in the 2017 Rugby Europe Women's Sevens Grand Prix among those not already qualified though the 2016–17 World Rugby Women's Sevens Series ranking. During the tournament, Harri Millard replaced the injured Morgan Williams.

The women's team was announced on 12 March 2018, followed by the men's team on 19 March 2018.

Men's tournament

Squad

Luke Treharne
Ethan Davies
Morgan Williams
James Benjamin
Angus O'Brien
Adam Thomas
Luke Morgan
Justin Tipuric
Owen Jenkins
Hallam Amos
Benjamin Roach
Tom Williams
Harri Millard

Pool D

Classification semi-finals

Match for seventh place

Women's tournament

Squad

Sinead Breeze
Laurie Harries
Sioned Harries
Hannah Jones
Jasmine Joyce
Bethan Lewis
Lucy Packer
Kayleigh Powell
Shona Powell-Hughes
Gemma Rowland
Elinor Snowsill
Sian Williams

Pool B

Classification semi-finals

Match for seventh place

Shooting

Team Wales announced its squad of 11 shooters (8 men and 3 women) on 24 January 2018.

Men

Women

Open

Squash

Team Wales announced its squad of 4 players (2 men and 2 women) on 24 January 2018.

Singles

Doubles

Swimming

Team Wales announced the selection of two para-swimmers on 20 December 2017. The remainder of its 14-strong squad of 5 men and 9 women was made public on 24 January 2018.

Men

Women

Table tennis

Team Wales announced the selection of parasport player Joshua Stacey on 29 November 2017. Three women were added to the squad on 24 January 2018.

Singles

Doubles

Team

Para-sport

Triathlon

Team Wales announced its squad of 4 triathletes (2 men and 2 women) on 24 January 2018.

Individual

Mixed Relay

Weightlifting

Team Wales announced its squad of 16 weightlifters and powerlifters (8 men and 8 women) in three tranches.

Twelve weightlifters were selected on 6 December 2017. Three powerlifters were selected on 20 December 2017 and a final weightlifter was added on 22 December 2017.

Men

Women

Powerlifting

Wales participated with 3 athletes (2 men and 1 woman).

Wrestling

Team Wales announced its squad of 2 wrestlers (both men) on 24 January 2018.

References

Nations at the 2018 Commonwealth Games
Wales at the Commonwealth Games
2018 in Welsh sport